Ciaran Paul McKenna (born 25 March 1998) is a Scottish professional footballer who plays as a centre back or right back for Queen of the South. McKenna has previously played for Falkirk, Hamilton Academical and Partick Thistle.

Early life 
McKenna was born in Glasgow and was educated at Cardinal Newman High School, Bellshill, and St Ninian's High School, Kirkintilloch. McKenna played in the Celtic Academy, before turning down the offer of a three-year professional contract with the club, to accept the offer of a scholarship with Duke University in North Carolina.

Club career

Early career 
McKenna had 42 appearances with the Duke Blue Devils over three seasons and scored two goals. McKenna also spent a spell during 2017 playing for Jacksonville Armada U-23 in the National Premier Soccer League.

Falkirk 
In January 2019, McKenna joined Falkirk. McKenna had 17 league appearances and scored two goals in his debut season as a professional with the Bairns.

Hamiliton Academical 
In June 2019, McKenna joined Hamilton Academical and had four league appearances and also four League Cup matches for the Accies.

Partick Thistle 
In August 2020, McKenna joined Partick Thistle on a two-year contract. McKenna had 34 league appearances and scored one goal, as well as 14 cup matches for the Harry Wraggs.

Queen of the South 
On 24 June 2022, McKenna joined Queen of the South on a one-year contract.

Personal life 
Between 14 November 2015 and 27 January 2016, McKenna was accused of rape by a fellow student at Duke University. The establishment then issued a six-semester suspension, which upon appeal by McKenna was increased to a ten-semester suspension, but this was overturned by legal action on a technicality as to the university's "double jeopardy" policy.

In June 2022, McKenna, married Jamaica Women's national team player Kayla McCoy married in Oak Park, Illinois, USA.

Career statistics

Honours

Club

Partick Thistle
Scottish League One: 2020–21

References

External links

1998 births
Living people
Scottish footballers
Falkirk F.C. players
Scottish Professional Football League players
Association football defenders
Hamilton Academical F.C. players
Celtic F.C. players
Scottish expatriate footballers
Scottish expatriates in the United States
Expatriate soccer players in the United States
Duke Blue Devils men's soccer players
Partick Thistle F.C. players
National Premier Soccer League players
Queen of the South F.C. players
Jacksonville Armada U-23 players
People educated at St Ninian's High School, Kirkintilloch